K. T. Kosalram (1915-1985) was an Indian politician. He was a member of Lok Sabha elected from Tiruchendur constituency in 1977, 1980 and 1984 elections. He was also a freedom fighter and a congressman. He belongs to Kalingar Vamsam. He owned Dina Sethi, a newspaper from Purasawakkam, Chennai. His great grandson is S K Pradeep Subash.

References 

Tamil Nadu politicians
India MPs 1977–1979
India MPs 1980–1984
India MPs 1984–1989
Lok Sabha members from Tamil Nadu
People from Thoothukudi district
1985 deaths
1915 births
Indian National Congress politicians from Tamil Nadu